, also called , is a baseball stadium in Minami-ku, Hiroshima, Japan. It is used primarily for baseball and is the home of the Hiroshima Toyo Carp of the Japanese Central League. The ballpark has a capacity of 32,000 people and opened on April 10, 2009. It replaced First Hiroshima Municipal Stadium and initially retained the old ballpark's official name. The stadium architecture is considered to be labeled as a retro-classic ballpark.

Naming rights
On November 6, 2008, Hiroshima City gave Mazda Motor Corporation naming rights to the stadium. In October of that year, Mazda proposed to call the stadium MAZDA Zoom-Zoom Stadium Hiroshima for the period between April 1, 2009 and March 31, 2014. On December 24, 2008, Mazda entered into a contract with the City of Hiroshima regarding the stadium's name and made official the abbreviated name "". The "Zoom-Zoom" name was a reference to a marketing campaign by Mazda.

References

External links 

General Information (carp.co.jp-Japanese)
Information on ballpark
New Stadium Blog (Japanese)

Nippon Professional Baseball venues
Sports venues in Hiroshima
Hiroshima Toyo Carp
Mazda
Sports venues completed in 2009
2009 establishments in Japan